MS Nieuw Statendam is a  operated by Holland America Line (HAL), a division of Carnival Corporation & plc. Her name, Nieuw Statendam, alludes to the five previous ships in HAL's fleet named Statendam. She is the second of three Pinnacle-class ships built by Italian shipbuilder Fincantieri after  (2016) and before  (2021). Two years after the first steel was cut in July 2016 to commence construction, she was delivered to HAL in November 2018 and began operating the following month.

Design
Main propulsion is via two ABB Azipods, each driven by a  electric motor. On two of the four engines, open loop exhaust gas cleaning systems are installed. The ship also carries 14 lifeboats and six tender boats built by Hatecke, each with a capacity of 150 passengers. All infrastructure and IT systems were provided by Lufthansa Systems.

Construction 
On 19 December 2014, Carnival Corporation announced it had ordered two new ships for their brands, with one being the second Pinnacle-class ship for HAL. The ship would be designed as the sister ship to MS Koningsdam, with similar dimensions and similar features that were introduced on Koningsdam. On 20 May 2016, the day Koningsdam was christened, HAL announced that the second Pinnacle-class ship would be named Nieuw Statendam, in honor of the name's history within the company.
On 12 July 2016, HAL celebrated the steel cutting of Nieuw Statendam, marking the beginning of her construction. The ceremony was performed in Fincantieri's Palermo shipyard, but the block being built there was subsequently re-located to the Marghera shipyard, where the rest of the ship would be constructed. On 20 March 2017, the keel was laid for Nieuw Statendam in Marghera.

On 6 December 2017, the coin ceremony was performed. Anne Marie Bartels served as the Madrina for the event, in which she welded an 1898 Dutch guilder to the ship's forward mast. The dry dock's gates were also briefly opened, allowing the hull to touch water for the first time. Shortly after, on 21 December 2017, the ship was floated out from the shipyard, where she would begin final outfitting.

Nieuw Statendam successfully completed her two sets of sea trials in August 2018. She first left Marghera on 10 August for two days before arriving at Fincantieri's Trieste shipyard to review the sea trial's data and perform hull maintenance. She left for her second set on 18 August and arrived in Marghera on 22 August for continued work prior to her delivery. On 29 November 2018, Nieuw Statendam was delivered to HAL in Marghera. She was christened by Oprah Winfrey on 2 February 2019 at Port Everglades in Fort Lauderdale, Florida, after performing a three-night sailing to Half Moon Cay hosted by Winfrey and Gayle King.

Service history 
Following her delivery, Nieuw Statendam sailed from Marghera to Rome, with a visit to Venice, to perform her inaugural voyage on 5 December 2018, a transatlantic crossing from Rome to Fort Lauderdale. The voyage called in Cartagena, Málaga, and Funchal. Nieuw Statendam sails Caribbean itineraries from Fort Lauderdale during the winter and re-positions in the spring to Europe to cruise from Amsterdam to Northern Europe and from Rome around the Mediterranean in the summer.

References

External links

 Holland America Line official site

Ships of the Holland America Line
Panamax cruise ships
Ships built by Fincantieri
Ships built in Venice
2017 ships